= Electrical computer =

Electrical computer may refer to one of the following:

- Electrical analog computer
- Electrical digital computer
